Abarema centiflora is a species of plant in the family Fabaceae. It is endemic to the east slope of the Bolivian Andes. It is a small tree found in humid montane forests.

References

centiflora
Endemic flora of Bolivia
Vulnerable plants
Taxonomy articles created by Polbot